The Australia women's national cricket team toured New Zealand in February 1997. They played against New Zealand in five One Day Internationals, which were competed for the Rose Bowl. Australia won the series 4–1.

Squads

Tour Match

50-over match: New Zealand A v Australia

WODI Series

1st ODI

2nd ODI

3rd ODI

4th ODI

5th ODI

References

External links
Australia Women tour of New Zealand 1996/97 from Cricinfo

Women's international cricket tours of New Zealand
1997 in New Zealand cricket
Australia women's national cricket team tours